Cosmophasis is a genus of spiders in the family Salticidae (jumping spiders). They are predominantly Southeast Asian, while some species occur in Africa and Australia. Although most species more or less mimic ants, there are also colorful species that follow a different strategy.

C. bitaeniata uses chemical mimicry to be accepted by the aggressive weaver ant species Oecophylla smaragdina.

One species, said to be not a particularly good ant mimic, was observed living near and preying on ants. According to (Murphy & Murphy, 2000), "to watch the spider stalking and killing its prey is an arachnological spectacular".

Description
Species in this genus are from 3.80 to 8.00 mm long. The cephalothoraxes are pear-shaped(for some males) or rectangular.

Taxonomy

, the World Spider Catalog accepted the following species:

 Cosmophasis albipes Berland & Millot, 1941 – Guinea
 Cosmophasis albomaculata Schenkel, 1944 – Timor
 Cosmophasis ambonensis Hurni-Cranston & Hill, 2020 - Ambon Island
 Cosmophasis arborea Berry, Beatty & Prószyński, 1997 – Caroline Islands
 Cosmophasis baehrae Zabka & Waldock, 2012 - Australia
 Cosmophasis bandaneira Hurni-Cranston & Hill, 2020 - Banda Islands
 Cosmophasis banika Żabka & Waldock, 2012 - Solomon Islands 
 Cosmophasis bitaeniata (Keyserling, 1882) – New Guinea, Australia, Micronesia
 Cosmophasis chlorophthalma (Simon, 1898) – New Hebrides
 Cosmophasis chopardi Berland & Millot, 1941 – Ivory Coast
 Cosmophasis colemani Żabka & Waldock, 2012 – Australia (Queensland)
 Cosmophasis courti Żabka & Waldock, 2012 – New Guinea  
 Cosmophasis cypria (Thorell, 1890) – Java
 Cosmophasis darwini Żabka & Waldock, 2012 – Australia (Northern Territory)  
 Cosmophasis depilata Caporiacco, 1940 – Ethiopia
 Cosmophasis estrellaensis Barrion & Litsinger, 1995 – Philippines
 Cosmophasis fazanica Caporiacco, 1936 – Libya
 Cosmophasis gemmans (Thorell, 1890) – Sumatra
 Cosmophasis harveyi Żabka & Waldock, 2012 – New Guinea
 Cosmophasis hortoni Żabka & Waldock, 2012 – Solomon Is.
 Cosmophasis humphreysi Żabka & Waldock, 2012 – New Guinea
 Cosmophasis kairiru Żabka & Waldock, 2012 – New Guinea
 Cosmophasis kohi Żabka & Waldock, 2012 – New Guinea
 Cosmophasis lami Berry, Beatty & Prószyński, 1997 – Fiji
 Cosmophasis laticlavia (Thorell, 1892) – Sumatra
 Cosmophasis lucidiventris Simon, 1910 – Gabon
 Cosmophasis lungga Żabka & Waldock, 2012 – Solomon Islands
 Cosmophasis maculiventris Strand, 1911 – Aru Islands
 Cosmophasis masarangi Merian, 1911 – Sulawesi
 Cosmophasis micans (L. Koch, 1880) – Queensland
 Cosmophasis micarioides (L. Koch, 1880) – New Guinea, Queensland, Solomon Islands
 Cosmophasis miniaceomicans (Simon, 1888) – Andaman Islands
 Cosmophasis modesta (L. Koch, 1880) – Queensland
 Cosmophasis monacha (Thorell, 1881) – New Guinea
 Cosmophasis motmot Żabka & Waldock, 2012 – New Guinea
 Cosmophasis nigrocyanea (Simon, 1885) – Egypt, Ethiopia-->
 Cosmophasis obscura (Keyserling, 1882) – Queensland
 Cosmophasis olorina (Simon, 1901) – Sri Lanka
 Cosmophasis ombria (Thorell, 1877) – Indonesia (Sumatra, Java, Sulawesi, Krakatau)
 Cosmophasis orsimoides Strand, 1911 – Kei Islands
 Cosmophasis panjangensis Żabka & Waldock, 2012 – Indonesia (Krakatau)
 Cosmophasis parangpilota Barrion & Litsinger, 1995 – Philippines
 Cosmophasis psittacina (Thorell, 1887) – Myanmar
 Cosmophasis pulchella Caporiacco, 1947 – Ethiopia
 Cosmophasis quadricincta (Simon, 1885) – Singapore
 Cosmophasis rakata Żabka & Waldock, 2012 – Indonesia (Krakatau)
 Cosmophasis risbeci Berland, 1938 – New Hebrides
 Cosmophasis sertungensis Żabka & Waldock, 2012 – Indonesia (Krakatau)
 Cosmophasis squamata Kulczyński, 1910 – Solomon Islands, Seychelles
 Cosmophasis strandi Caporiacco, 1947 – East Africa
 Cosmophasis tavurvur Żabka & Waldock, 2012 – New Guinea
 Cosmophasis thalassina (C. L. Koch, 1846) – Malaysia to Australia
 Cosmophasis tricincta Simon, 1910 – Bioko
 Cosmophasis trioipina Barrion & Litsinger, 1995 – Philippines
 Cosmophasis tristriatus (L. Koch, 1880) – Palau Is.
 Cosmophasis trobriand Żabka & Waldock, 2012 – New Guinea
 Cosmophasis umbratica Simon, 1903 – India to Sumatra
 Cosmophasis valerieae Prószyński & Deeleman-Reinhold, 2010 – Indonesia (Java, Lesser Sunda Is.)
 Cosmophasis viridifasciata (Doleschall, 1859) – Sumatra to New Guinea
 Cosmophasis waeri Hurni-Cranston & Hill, 2020 - Banda Islands
 Cosmophasis weyersi (Simon, 1899) – Sumatra
Cosmophasis xiaolonghaensis Cao & Li, 2016

In 2012, Marek Żabka and Julianne Waldock proposed 5 new species groups, it being the C.thalassina species group, C. bitaeniata species group, C. micarioides species group, C. tristriatus species group, and the C. rakata species group.
Formerly placed in this genus include:
 Cosmophasis australis Simon, 1902 → Phintella australis
 Cosmophasis caerulea Simon, 1901 → Mexcala caerulea
 Cosmophasis fagei Lessert, 1925 → Icius fagei
 Cosmophasis quadrimaculata Lawrence, 1942 → Mexcala quadrimaculata
 Cosmophasis longiventris Simon, 1903  → Chrysilla lauta

References

Further reading
  (2001): Exploitation of the green tree ant, Oecophylla smaragdina, by the salticid spider Cosmophasis bitaeniata. Australian Journal of Zoology 49: 129–137.
  (2002): Mimicry of host cuticular hydrocarbons by salticid spider Cosmophasis bitaeniata that preys on larvae of tree ants Oecophylla smaragdina. Journal of Chemical Ecology 28: 835–848. 
  (2006): Chemical mimicry of the ant Oecophylla smaragdina by the myrmecophilous spider Cosmophasis bitaeniata: Is it colony-specific? Journal of Ethology 24(3): 239-246.

External links
 Photograph of Cosmophasis sp. 
 Photograph of C. micarioides 
 Photograph of C. rubra 

Salticidae genera
Spiders of Africa
Spiders of Asia
Spiders of Australia
Salticidae